HUION is a China-based drawing tablet brand founded on 12 March 2011 by Henry Xu. It provides drawing tablets, light pads, and pen displays, for beginners and professionals. Its products are compatible with Android, Windows, macOS, Linux and can be used to create digital works, and photo editing.

Headquartered in Shenzhen, HUION has entered the market in Indonesia and the market of India. In 2018, it introduced the H610 Pro V2, which is lightweight and features a battery-free stylus, tilt function and 8192 pressure levels.

History
HUION stepped into the industry of graphic tablet in 2011. In 2014, it rolled out the brand's first light pad product.

In 2019, the manufacturer participated in the CES convention. In the same year, it set up a distributor in Indonesia.

In January 2021, HUION unveiled a new product, which combines a keyboard and a pen tablet into one.

References

External links 
 Official website

Chinese brands
Display technology
Computing input devices
2011 establishments in China
Display technology companies